Ionic  potential is the ratio of the electrical charge (z) to the radius (r) of an ion.

As such, this ratio is a measure of the charge density at the surface of the ion; usually the denser the charge, the stronger the bond formed by the ion with ions of opposite charge.

The ionic potential gives an indication of how strongly, or weakly, the ion will be electrostatically attracted by ions of opposite charge; and to what extent the ion will be repelled by ions of the same charge. 

Victor Moritz Goldschmidt, the father of modern geochemistry found that the behavior of an element in its environment could be predicted from its ionic potential and illustrated this with a diagram (plot of the bare ionic radius as a function of the ionic charge). However, once anoxic ground water is pumped from a deep well and is discharged to the surface, it enters in contact with atmospheric oxygen.

Millot (1970) also illustrated the importance of the ionic potential of cations to explain the high, or the low, solubility of minerals and the expansive behaviour (swelling/shrinking) of clay materials.

The ionic potential of the different cations (and ) present in the interlayer of clay minerals also contribute to explain their swelling/shrinking properties. In illite, the interlayer is totally collapsed because of the presence of the poorly hydrated . 

Ionic potential is also a measure of the polarising power of a cation.

Ionic potential could be used as a general criterion for the selection of efficient adsorbents for toxic elements.

See also

 Ionization energy
 Metal ions in aqueous solution
 Surface charge

References

Binding energy
Chemical properties
Ions
Physical chemistry
Electrochemical potentials
Atomic radius